Daniel Erasmus is a South African athlete who won twelve medals at the Paralympic Games.

At the 1964 Summer Paralympics in Tokyo, Japan, Erasmus competed in athletics and medalled in all four of his events, taking gold in the discus and shot put and silver in the club throw and javelin. At the 1968 games in Tel Aviv, Israel, he took part in five athletics events and medalled in four, taking gold in shot put and javelin and silver in club throw and discus. He also competed in lawn bowls that year, winning the singles event and taking second in pairs. His last Paralympic appearance was at the 1972 games in Heidelberg, West Germany, where he took silver in shot put and bronze in javelin.

References

Living people
Paralympic athletes of South Africa
Athletes (track and field) at the 1964 Summer Paralympics
Athletes (track and field) at the 1968 Summer Paralympics
Athletes (track and field) at the 1972 Summer Paralympics
Paralympic lawn bowls players of South Africa
Lawn bowls players at the 1968 Summer Paralympics
Paralympic gold medalists for South Africa
Paralympic silver medalists for South Africa
Paralympic bronze medalists for South Africa
Wheelchair category Paralympic competitors
Medalists at the 1964 Summer Paralympics
Medalists at the 1968 Summer Paralympics
Medalists at the 1972 Summer Paralympics
South African male bowls players
Year of birth missing (living people)
Paralympic medalists in athletics (track and field)
Paralympic medalists in lawn bowls
South African male discus throwers
South African male shot putters
South African male javelin throwers
Paralympic discus throwers
Paralympic shot putters
Paralympic javelin throwers
Paralympic club throwers
20th-century South African people
21st-century South African people